Meher Afroz Shaon (born 12 October 1981) is a Bangladeshi actress, director and playback singer. She won Bangladesh National Film Award for Best Female Playback Singer for her performance in the film Krishnopokkho (2016). She was the wife of writer and director Humayun Ahmed.

Early life
Shaon was born to Mohammad Ali, an engineer; and Tahura Ali, who was a member of parliament from Constituency 319 of the 9th Bangladesh Parliament.

Shaon studied at Viqarunnisa Noon School and College. She obtained a Secondary School Certificate and a Higher Secondary Certificate in 1996 and 1998, respectively. She then enrolled at the University of Asia Pacific and received a Bachelor of Architecture degree in 2008.

Career
Shaon was an enlisted artist of BTV and began her career acting as a child artist in BTV drama Swadhinota Amar Swadhinota in 1988. She started working with Humayun Ahmed in a drama named Jononee in 1991. She was in drama serial Nokkhotrer Raat in 1996 and Aaj Robibar in 1999. She appeared in Srabon Megher Din directed by Humayun Ahmed the same year.

Personal life
Shaon was married to Humayun Ahmed, from 2004 until his death in 2012. She has two sons - Nishad Humayun and Ninith Humayun. She also had a girl named Lilaboti with Humayun Ahmed who didn't survive much longer but a lake was named after this child out of love in Nuhash Polli. Her mother Tahura Ali is a seasoned politician and former MP and her father Mohammad Ali is a reputed business person.

Works

Filmography

Television dramas

Actress

Director 

Beside directing several movies, Shaon also began to script some movies. As of March 2018, she was drafting scripts of Gouripur Junction and Nokkhotrer Raat.

Television host 
 Meghe Dhaka Tara on Maasranga Television

Discography

Solo
 Na Manushi Bone

Singles
 Ilshe Guri

Duet
 Je Thake Akhi Pollobe

Singles
 Juboti Radhey

Film scores
 Srabon Megher Din
 Dui Duari
 Chandrokotha
 Shyamol Chhaya
 Noy Number Bipod Sanket
 Amar Ache Jol
 Krishnopokkho
 Pita

References

External links
 

Living people
Bangladeshi television actresses
Bangladeshi film directors
Family of Humayun Ahmed
21st-century Bangladeshi women singers
21st-century Bangladeshi singers
Bangladeshi film actresses
Best Female Playback Singer National Film Award (Bangladesh) winners
Place of birth missing (living people)
Bangladeshi women film directors
1981 births